The 1971 World Table Tennis Championships – Swaythling Cup (men's team) was the 31st edition of the men's team championship.

China won the gold medal defeating Japan 5–2 in the final. Yugoslavia won the bronze medal after winning the third place play off.

Medalists

Swaythling Cup tables

Second stage round

Group 1

Group 2

Third-place playoff

Final

See also
List of World Table Tennis Championships medalists

References

-